Jindo may refer to:

 Jindo Island, a South Korean island
 Jindo County, a South Korean county, consisting largely of Jindo Island
 Korean Jindo, a breed of dog indigenous to Jindo Island